The NATO Science for Peace and Security (SPS) Programme is a NATO programme supporting civil science cooperation and innovation. Created in 2006 as the merger of the NATO Science Committee (SCOM) and the Committee on the Challenges of Modern Society (CCMS), the SPS offers grants to scientists in NATO and NATO Partner countries for work on civil science projects. Partner countries are located in Eastern Europe and the former Soviet Union. Grants are also available to scientists in seven countries known as the Mediterranean Dialogue: Algeria, Egypt, Israel, Jordan, Mauritania, Morocco, and Tunisia.

Each SPS project is conducted in a specific NATO priority area by a collaboration between working scientists in eligible Partner countries and scientists in NATO Allied countries. Applications must be in the area of the SPS Key Priorities.

Representative SPS projects

 Improvement of Egypt's water supply.
 South Caucasus River Monitoring—assess pollutants and radionuclides in the Kura and Araks rivers, shared by Azerbaijan, Armenia, and Georgia.
 Preparation of handbooks on environmental aspects of military compounds (safe drinking water, waste management, energy supply).
 Virtual Silk Highway—satellite-based broadband technology for universities and civil research institutions in the South Caucasus and Central Asia.
 STANDEX—prototype system for remote detection of suicide bombers.
 Safe conversion of mélange (a highly toxic rocket fuel oxidizer left from the Cold War era) in Central Asia.

See also
 Summer School Marktoberdorf, a computer science summer school in Germany supported by SPS

References

External links
 NATO SPS website

Organizations established in 2006
International scientific organizations
NATO agencies